Scott Knight (born 28 April 1959 in King Island, Tasmania) is a former Australian rules footballer who played for Collingwood in the Victorian Football League (VFL) in 1984. He was recruited from the North Launceston Football Club in the Northern Tasmanian Football League with the second last selection in the first ever VFL Draft in 1981.

He is originally from King Island, Tasmania. His son, Matthew, plays basketball for the Perth Wildcats of the National Basketball League.

References

External links 
 

Living people
1959 births
Australian rules footballers from Tasmania
Burnie Hawks Football Club players
Collingwood Football Club players
North Launceston Football Club players